The Public Records Act 1958 is an Act of the Parliament of the United Kingdom forming the main legislation governing public records in the United Kingdom.

It established a cohesive regulatory framework for public records at the Public Record Office and other places of deposit. It also transferred responsibility for public records from the Master of the Rolls to the Lord Chancellor. The Act stipulated that records would be transferred to the Public Record Office 30 years after creation and that most would be opened 50 years after creation. Subsection 3(4) of the Act allowed government departments to retain records that were either still in use 30 years after creation or were of special sensitivity, such as intelligence agency materials and weapons of mass destruction information. The time of opening was subsequently reduced to 30 years by the Public Records Act 1967 and then access was completely redefined as being on creation, unless subject to an exemption, by the Freedom of Information Act 2000.

The Australian Constitution (Public Record Copy) Act 1990 was passed in 1990 on the request of Australia to allow the original copy of the Commonwealth of Australia Constitution Act 1900 to be permanently removed from the Public Records Office and given to Australia. The UK government agreed as a gift to celebrate the bicentenary of British settlement in Australia.

References

External links

Text of the Public Records Act on the National Archives' site

United Kingdom Acts of Parliament 1958